The rusty-breasted antpitta (Grallaricula ferrugineipectus) is a species of bird in the family Grallariidae. It is found in the Andes of Colombia and Venezuela. Its natural habitats are subtropical or tropical moist montane forest and heavily degraded former forest.

References

rusty-breasted antpitta
Birds of the Colombian Andes
Birds of the Venezuelan Andes
Birds of the Sierra Nevada de Santa Marta
rusty-breasted antpitta
rusty-breasted antpitta
Taxonomy articles created by Polbot